Meadow Run is a  long 2nd order tributary to Jacobs Creek in Westmoreland County, Pennsylvania.

Course
Meadow Run rises about 1.5 miles southwest of Ruffsdale, Pennsylvania, and then flows southwest to join Jacobs Creek about 0.75 miles west-northwest of Chaintown.

Watershed
Meadow Run drains  of area, receives about 42.3 in/year of precipitation, has a wetness index of 379.72, and is about 40% forested.

References

 
Tributaries of the Ohio River
Rivers of Pennsylvania
Rivers of Westmoreland County, Pennsylvania
Allegheny Plateau